Bulgaria debuted in the Eurovision Song Contest 2005 with the song "Lorraine" written by Vesselin Vesselinov-Eko and Orlin Pavlov. The song was performed by the band Kaffe. The Bulgarian broadcaster Bulgarian National Television (BNT) organised the national final Bŭlgarskata pesen v „Evroviziya 2005” in order to select the Bulgarian entry for the 2005 contest in Kyiv, Ukraine. 24 entries were selected to participate in the national final which consisted of two shows: a semi-final and a final, held on 22 January 2005 and 12 February 2005, respectively. The top twelve songs of the semi-final as determined by an eleven-member jury panel qualified to the final. In the final, public televoting exclusively selected "Lorraine" performed by Kaffe as the winning entry with 76,590 votes. 

Bulgaria competed in the semi-final of the Eurovision Song Contest which took place on 19 May 2005. Performing during the show in position 21, "Lorraine" was not announced among the top 10 entries of the semi-final and therefore did not qualify to compete in the final. It was later revealed that Bulgaria placed nineteenth out of the 25 participating countries in the semi-final with 49 points.

Background 

On 4 November 2004, the Bulgarian national broadcaster, Bulgarian National Television (BNT), confirmed Bulgaria's participation in the 2005 Eurovision Song Contest for the first time after several unsuccessful attempts before 2000. BNT would also broadcast the event within Bulgaria and organise the selection process for the nation's entry. On 26 November 2004, the broadcaster announced that a national final would be organised in order to select the Bulgarian entry for the 2005 competition.

Before Eurovision

Bŭlgarskata pesen v „Evroviziya 2005” 
Bŭlgarskata pesen v „Evroviziya 2005” (The Bulgarian song in Eurovision 2005) was the national final format developed by BNT which determined the artist and song that would represent Bulgaria at the Eurovision Song Contest 2005. The competition consisted of a semi-final on 22 January 2005 and a final on 12 February 2005. Both shows were hosted by Aleksandra Surchadzhieva and Deyan Slavchev and broadcast on Channel 1.

Competing entries 
On 2 December 2004, BNT opened a submission period for artists and songwriters to submit their entries until 15 January 2005. By the end of the deadline, the broadcaster received 104 entries. On 18 January 2005, the twenty-four artists and songs selected for the competition by an eleven-member committee were announced. The committee consisted of Borislav Gerontiev (Program Director of BNT), Yordanka Hristova (singer), Stefan Dimitrov (singer and composer), Krasimir Gyulmezov (singer-songwriter and musician), Georgi Krasimirov (composer and producer), Ana-Maria Tonkova (music journalist), Konstantin Markov (musician), Ivan Lechev (musician and composer), Alexander Petrov (poet), Slavcho Nikolov (musician and composer) and Ivaylo Kitsov (music critic and journalist).

Shows

Semi-final 
The semi-final took place on 22 January 2005 at the BNT studios in Sofia. Twelve entries qualified to the final based on the votes of a jury panel. The eleven-person jury consisted of Borislav Gerontiev, Yordanka Hristova, Stefan Dimitrov, Krasimir Gyulmezov, Georgi Krasimirov, Ana-Maria Tonkova, Konstantin Markov, Ivan Lechev, Alexander Petrov, Slavcho Nikolov and Ivaylo Kitsov. In addition to the performances of the competing entries, the guest performer was Bon-Bon.

Final 
The final took place on 12 February 2005 at the National Palace of Culture in Sofia. The twelve semi-final qualifiers competed and "Lorraine" performed by Kaffe was selected as the winner exclusively by public televoting which ran between 28 January and 12 February 2005. Slavi Trifonov and Sofi Marinova refused to perform their song as they believed that the voting was fixed in favour of Kaffe. In addition to the performances of the competing entries, guest performers were B.T.R. and Dimitar Ekimov.

Controversy 
Following the announcement of Kaffe as the winner of the Bulgarian national final, booing was heard from the audience which left the venue before the reprise performance. Further accusations were made afterwards by Slavi Trifonov that the producers of Kaffe had purchased SIM cards and hired people in advance to vote for the band; "Lorraine" received only 3,000 votes before the final, however, the number increased drastically by 60,000 at the last moment. On 13 February, mobile operator MobilTel which was responsible for the SMS voting released a statement confirming that the results were legitimate. BNT also stated that they would consider taking legal action against Trifonov for not performing his song in the final. In addition, it was claimed that "Lorraine" had plagarised the song "Ne si otivay" performed by Ruslan Mainov, which was released in 2001.

At Eurovision
According to Eurovision rules, all nations with the exceptions of the host country, the "Big Four" (France, Germany, Spain and the United Kingdom) and the ten highest placed finishers in the 2004 contest are required to qualify from the semi-final on 19 May 2005 in order to compete for the final on 21 May 2005; the top ten countries from the semi-final progress to the final. On 22 March 2005, a special allocation draw was held which determined the running order for the semi-final and Bulgaria was set to perform in position 21, following the entry from Croatia and before the entry from Ireland. At the end of the semi-final, Bulgaria was not announced among the top 10 entries and therefore failed to qualify to compete in the final. It was later revealed that Bulgaria placed nineteenth in the semi-final, receiving a total of 49 points.

The semi-final and the final were broadcast in Bulgaria on Channel 1 with commentary by Elena Rosberg and Georgi Kushvaliev. The Bulgarian spokesperson, who announced the Bulgarian votes during the final, was Evgenia Atanasova.

Voting 
Below is a breakdown of points awarded to Bulgaria and awarded by Bulgaria in the semi-final and grand final of the contest. The nation awarded its 12 points to Belarus in the semi-final and to Greece in the final of the contest.

Points awarded to Bulgaria

Points awarded by Bulgaria

References

Works cited 
 

2005
Countries in the Eurovision Song Contest 2005
Eurovision